Sky News Weather Channel is an Australian satellite television channel owned by Australian News Channel, a subsidiary of News Corp Australia. Launched on 1 January 1999, the channel broadcasts weather forecasts and weather-related news and analysis 24 hours a day.

SNWC runs on a 15-minute menu of local, national, regional, dam level and rainfall forecasts, as well as continuous coverage of extreme weather if required.

Sky News Weather Channel also simulcasts live the Sky News Regional-produced breakfast program Sky News Breakfast (formerly Headline News) along with that channel on weekdays from 6am to 8:30am.

History

Sky News Weather Channel started broadcasting on 1 January 1999 under the name "Weather 21": channel 21 on the Austar channel line-up.  Weather 21 was set up by Cox Inall Communications and the meteorological firm The Weather Company and was owned by Austar.  The programming was pitched to Austar's largely rural and regional audience. Initial presenters on the channel were Allan Humphries, Lyndal Davies, and meteorologist Mark Hardy, broadcasting live from 6am to 10pm daily, with the overnight programming consisting of an automated loop of forecasts, satellite, and radar, accompanied by music.

In early 2000, no longer located at 21, the name was changed to "The Weather Channel".  As the hours of live presentation were extended, presenters Tracey Malmborg, Jaynie Seal, Rebecca LeTourneau and Garry Youngberry were added.

In 2003 Austar sold the channel to XYZ Networks and TWC appeared on the Foxtel network, morphing to better suit the now largely metropolitan audience.   Foxtel's Digitals platform extended its distribution with an Open TV interactive weather application, Weather Active.

Major changes in 2004 included logo, graphics, programming line-up and a new version of Weather Active for Foxtel Digital.

In the middle of June 2008, the Weather Channel again had a major change with its graphics as its programming line-up grew.

Weather content on the channel is provided by Metra Information Limited and the Australian Bureau of Meteorology.

Change of management and re-branding

In the wake of the 2012 merger of Foxtel and Austar, and the subsequent dissolution of XYZ Networks, it was announced that from 30 November 2012 management and operational responsibility for The Weather Channel would be assumed by Sky News Australia, with The Weather Channel to be re-launched as Sky News Weather in 2013. The rebrand took place on 25 January 2013.

Digital services
On Foxtel and Austar digital services, an interactive weather service is available. It provides local weather information, such as current conditions, marine and surf reports, dam information, 28-day rain forecast, capital city forecast and forecasts for the user's postcode. It also provides a state radar, national satellite and national lightning tracker.

Notable presenters

Current 
 Jaynie Seal
 Kristie Lloyd
 Emma Ralph
 Samantha Chiari
 Rachel Raez
 Rob Sharpe – Meteorologist
 Alison Osborne – Meteorologist

Former 

 Graham Creed
 Allan Humphries
 Mark Hardy
 Tracey Malmborg
 Sally Ayhan
 Christina Birtles
 Kyly Boldy
 Lee Brooks
 Lyndal Davies
 Samantha Dawson
 Amanda Duval
 Kenny Heatley (later joining Seven)
 Josh Holt
 Rose Jacobs
 Dave Kirwan
 Danielle Bowern
 Amy Greenbank

 Gavin Morris
 Reuben Mourad
 Ed Phillips
 Magdalena Roze
 Angela Tsun
 Jane Bunn
 Danielle Robertson
 Tom Saunders
 Ben Domensino
 Richard Whitaker

References

External links

English-language television stations in Australia
Television networks in Australia
Weather television networks
Television channels and stations established in 1999
1999 establishments in Australia
Weather
Foxtel